Papa: Hemingway in Cuba is a 2015 Canadian-American biographical film. It was written by Denne Bart Petitclerc, and directed by Bob Yari. The film is based on events from Ernest Hemingway's life in Havana, Cuba in the 1950s, and on a friendship that developed there between Hemingway and Petitclerc, who was then a young journalist. The film received generally unfavorable reviews.

Plot
In 1959, young journalist Ed Myers (a character representing Petitclerc) is working for a Miami newspaper. He wants to be a writer and had long admired Ernest Hemingway, then living in Cuba. Myers writes to Hemingway and is surprised when he answers, inviting the journalist to Cuba to go fishing with him. While the Cuban Revolution comes to a boil around them, Hemingway advises Myers on his writing. Myers continues to write articles for his newspaper, reporting on the Revolution.

An early scene from the film depicts rebels allied with Fidel Castro bursting into a street near Havana's Government Palace to confront soldiers loyal to the government of Fulgencio Batista. Hemingway and Myers take cover, with Hemingway guiding Myers through the war zone. They gradually develop a friendship and Myers spends an increasing amount of time with Hemingway and his fourth wife Mary.

Cast
 Giovanni Ribisi as Ed Myers
 Joely Richardson as Mary Welsh Hemingway
 Adrian Sparks as Ernest Hemingway
 Minka Kelly as Debbie Hunt
 James Remar as Santo Trafficante
 Shaun Toub as Evan Shipman
 Mariel Hemingway as Female guest
 Anthony Molinari as John Fletcher
 Daniel Travis as Bob Luther
 Frank Licari as Sal
 Rodrigo Obregón as Lucas

Production
Petitclerc had written the screenplay and had begun working on production of the film at the time of his death in 2006.

Production on location in Cuba concluded in May 2014. It was the first Hollywood film to be filmed in Cuba since the 1959 revolution, according to The Hollywood Reporter. The filmmakers received permission to film inside Finca Vigía, Hemingway's residence from 1939 to 1960. The government later adapted it as a national museum. Hemingway wrote For Whom the Bell Tolls and The Old Man and the Sea at Finca Vigía.

The film's title, Papa, was Hemingway's nickname. He was called "Papa" by his colleagues and admirers, as well as his family.

Reception
Papa: Hemingway in Cuba received generally negative reviews from critics. On Rotten Tomatoes, the film has an approval rating of 11% based on reviews from 45 critics. The site's consensus quoted Hemingway's The Old Man and the Sea (1952) in concluding, "A man can be destroyed but not defeated, although the desultory Papa: Hemingway in Cuba makes one feel as if both can be accomplished by watching a single film." On Metacritic it had a score of 37 out of 100, based on reviews from 17 critics, indicating "generally unfavorable reviews".

Joe Leydon of Variety wrote that the film "never transcends the tropes of a formulaic biopic that views its famous subject through the eyes of a worshipful young devotee." Miriam Di Nunzio of the Chicago Sun-Times gave it 2.5 out of 4 and called it  "A film that is beautiful to look at but lacks clear vision." Peter Travers of Rolling Stone gave it 2 out 4 and gave the film a mixed review: "Papa gives us sights to revel in. Oddly, what hurts is the clunky, overripe script." Helen Verongos of The New York Times wrote: "Ms. Richardson comforts and coaxes and exasperatedly, bitingly demeans, but she and Mr. Sparks play past each other instead of engaging."

See also

 Ernest Hemingway
 Cuban Revolution

References

External links
 

2015 films
English-language Canadian films
2015 biographical drama films
Canadian biographical drama films
American biographical drama films
Films set in Cuba
Films shot in California
Films shot in Cuba
Films shot in Havana
2015 drama films
2010s English-language films
2010s American films
2010s Canadian films